Cylindropuntia tunicata, commonly referred to as sheathed cholla, is a cholla native to the Chihuahuan Desert of North America and parts of South America.

Distribution

As an agricultural weed
C. tunicata is an invasive species affecting agriculture in Queensland, Australia.

References

tunicata
Cacti of the United States
Cacti of Mexico
Flora of Texas
Flora of Arizona
Flora of New Mexico
North American desert flora
Invasive agricultural pests